

Jacek Bednarek (born 27 January 1964 in Rybnik, Śląskie) is a male former racewalker from Poland, who represented his native country at the 1988 Summer Olympics. He set his personal best (3:51.34) in the men's 50 km walk event in 1988. He set a Polish national record in the 50 km walk.

He took part in the 1988 Olympics in Seoul where he was 24th in a 50-kilometer race walk. He was a World Race Walking Cup participant on five occasions.

Bednarek was the 1989 Polish champion in the 50 km walk and a bronze medalist in 1984 in the 20 km walk. For most of his career, he was a ROW Rybnik member.

International competitions

Personal bests 
 5 kilometres race walk (indoor) – 19:20,66 (February 21, 1987, Liévin) – 8th result in the history of Polish athletics
 20 kilometres race walk – 1:24:19 (September 13, 1986, Warsaw)
 50 kilometres race walk – 3:51:34 (July 31, 1988, Södertälje) – 13th result in the history of Polish athletics
 50 kilometres race walk – 3:52:53,0 (May 15, 1992, Bergen (Fana)) – Polish record

References

1964 births
Living people
People from Rybnik
Sportspeople from Silesian Voivodeship
Polish male racewalkers
Olympic athletes of Poland
Athletes (track and field) at the 1988 Summer Olympics